Tokyo holds many festivals (matsuri) throughout the year. Major Shinto shrine festivals include the Sanno Festival at Hie Shrine, and the Sanja Festival at Asakusa Shrine. The Kanda Matsuri in Tokyo is held every two years in May. The festival features a parade with elaborately decorated floats and thousands of people.

More secular and seasonal festivals include cherry blossom, or sakura, viewing parties in the spring where thousands gather in parks such as Ueno Park, Inokashira Park, and the Shinjuku Gyoen National Garden for picnics under the cherry trees.  In the summer annual firework and dance festivals such as the Sumida River fireworks festival on the last Saturday of July, and the Kōenji Awa Odori dance festival on the last weekend in August attract millions of viewers.

See also

 Festivals in Nagoya
 Culture of Tokyo

References

 
Tokyo
Tokyo